The Dominican Convent, Regensburg is a convent of the Dominican Order in Regensburg in Bavaria in the Roman Catholic Diocese of Regensburg.

History 
In 1803 a girls' school was founded which remains to the present time.

In the library of Keble College, Oxford, is an illuminated manuscript from the convent, "Lectionarium Ordinis Fratrum Praedicatorum" known in English as the Regensburg Lectionary (for the convent of Dominican nuns "zum Heiligen Kreuz", Regensburg, c. 1267–76).

North America
In 1853 the Prioress Mother Maria Benedicta Bauer sent some sisters to America. There are today 12 American congregations which derive from the Regensburg convent. Among them are the Dominican Sisters of Adrian, Michigan, and the Racine Dominican Sisters.

Footnotes

Further reading
Hanna, Ralph (2018) The Regensburg Lectionary at Keble College, Oxford. Oxford: Keble College

External links 
 Dominikanerinnenkloster Heilig Kreuz (in German)
 Keble's most famous illuminated manuscript; Keble College; 29 April 2008

1230s establishments in the Holy Roman Empire
1233 establishments in Europe
Dominican nuns
Monasteries in Bavaria